Groove Theory is the only studio album by the American R&B duo Groove Theory, released on October 24, 1995 by Epic Records. The album peaked at number sixty-nine on the US Billboard 200 chart. In October 1996, it was certified gold by the Recording Industry Association of America (RIAA) for surpassing 500,000 copies in the United States.

Background

Reception

Stanton Swihart of AllMusic considered the effort "an exquisite, even innovative album. Not only did it (in retrospect) help to herald the progressive neo-soul movement, but its melding of decidedly hip-hop production techniques... with the emotional impulses and themes of soul was still a novel approach to making R&B at the time."

The album was certified gold by October 1996.

Track listing
All music by B. Wilson, A. Larrieux, and D. Brown except where noted.

Personnel
Information taken from AllMusic.
Art direction – Carol Chen
Bass – Darryl Brown, Eric "Ibo" Butler, Kirk Lyons
Design – Sean Evans
Drums – Ralph Rolle
Engineering – Russell Elevado, Joe Hornof
Executive production – Jimmy Henchman, Amel Larrieux
Guitar – Darryl Brown, Mike "Dino" Campbell
Keyboard arrangements – Bryce Wilson
Keyboards – Darryl Brown, Kevin Deane, Gary Montoute, Bryce Wilson
Mastering – Chris Gehringer
Mixing – Ron Banks, Russell Elevado, Dave Kennedy, Angela Piva
Percussion – Jeff Haynes
Production – Lamont Boles, Amel Larrieux, Bryce Wilson
Production coordination – Donald Wood, Kim Lumpkin
Programming – Isiah Lee
Saxophone – Mike Phillips
Stylist – Jamie Kimmelman
Vocal arrangement – Amel Larrieux, Laru Larrieux, Trey Lorenz
Vocals – Amel Larrieux, Laru Larrieux
Vocals (background) – Sean Jasper, Jean, Amel Larrieux, Laru Larrieux, Trey Lorenz, Troy Montgomery

Charts

Album

Singles

"—" denotes releases that did not chart.

References

External links
 
 Groove Theory at Discogs

1995 debut albums
Epic Records albums
Groove Theory albums